The Södermanland Runic Inscription 174  is a Viking Age runestone engraved in Old Norse with the Younger Futhark runic alphabet. It is located at Aspö Church in Strängnäs Municipality. The style of the runestone is a categorized as Pr1.

Inscription
Transliteration of the runes into Latin characters

 [ub]lubʀ · lit · kira : kuml : likhus : auk : bru · at sun sin : biurn : uaʀ trebin : a : kut:lanti : þy : lit : fiur · sit : fluþu : kankiʀ : þaiʀ uiþ[ulkuʀ] : uiltu iki halta : guþ : hilbi : anta : hans
Old Norse transcription:

 

English translation:

 "Ólafr(?)/Óblauðr(?)/Upphlaupr(?) had the monument and sarcophagus/hospice and bridge made in memory of his son Bjôrn, (who) was killed on Gotland. Because his followers fled, he lost his life; they ... would not hold. May God help his spirit."

References

Runestones in Södermanland
Runestones in memory of Viking warriors